"We Love You" is a 1986 song by English electronic band Orchestral Manoeuvres in the Dark (OMD), released as the second single from their album The Pacific Age. It was originally written for the film Playing for Keeps (1986).

In a retrospective review of "We Love You", AllMusic critic Dave Thompson wrote that the song "had all the makings of a smash [hit]", while praising its instrumentation and "splendidly anthemic chorus". He also observed "barely veiled lyrics with anti-militaristic intent". KROQ included the track in its "Top 106.7 Songs of 1987" (the year of its US release).

Track listing
7"
 "We Love You" – 3:59
 "We Love You" (Dub) – 6:20

Limited edition 2×7"
 "We Love You" – 3:59
 "We Love You" (Dub) – 6:20 
 "If You Leave" – 4:30
 "88 Seconds in Greensboro" – 4:20

Limited edition 7" + Cassette-Maxi Retro
 "We Love You" – 3:59
 "We Love You" (Dub) – 6:20

 "Souvenir"
 "Electricity"
 "Enola Gay"
 "Joan of Arc"
 "We Love You"
 "We Love You" (Dub)

12"
 "We Love You" (extended) – 6:15
 "We Love You" (7" version) – 3:59
 "We Love You" (Dub) – 6:20

Charts

References

External links

1986 singles
Orchestral Manoeuvres in the Dark songs
Song recordings produced by Stephen Hague
1986 songs
Virgin Records singles
Songs written by Paul Humphreys
Songs written by Andy McCluskey
Songs written by Stephen Hague